Dương Tơ is a commune of Phú Quốc, Kien Giang, Vietnam. With an area of 80.4 km2, the population in 1999 was 5919 people, with a population density of 74 persons per km2.

References

Populated places in Kiên Giang province